Faith is confidence or trust in a particular religious belief system.
 Faith in Buddhism
 Faith in Christianity
 Jewish principles of faith
 Secular Faith

Faith may also refer to:
 Bad faith, a legal concept in which a malicious motive on the part of a party in a lawsuit undermines their case
 Bad faith (existentialism), mauvaise foi, a philosophical concept wherein one denies one's total freedom, instead choosing to behave as an inert object
 Fáith, the Irish for "prophet, seer"
 Good faith, bona fides, the mental and moral state of honesty
 Religion, any specific system of belief ("one's faith")
 Religious belief, the belief in the reality of the mythological, supernatural, or spiritual aspects of a religion
 The first of the theological virtues in Catholic theology
 Trust (social science) in a person or entity
 Uberrima fides (Utmost good faith), the legal doctrine of certain contractual obligations

As a proper name

Places in the United States
 Faith, Minnesota
 Faith, Missouri
 Faith, North Carolina
 Faith, South Dakota

Music

Bands
 Faith (band), a doom metal group

Albums
 Faith (The Cure album), 1981
 Faith (Dynamic Praise album), 2001
 Faith (Eyes of Eden album), 2007
 Faith (Faith Evans album), 1995
 Faith (Faith Hill album), 1998
 Faith (George Michael album), 1987
 Faith (H2O album), 1984
 Faith (Hyde album), 2006
 Faith (Pop Smoke album), 2021
 Faith (Rise and Fall album), 2012
 Faith: A Holiday Album, 1999 album by Kenny G
 Faith: A Hymns Collection, a 2006 album by Avalon

Songs
 "Faith" (Celine Dion song), 2003
 "Faith" (Galantis and Dolly Parton song), 2019
 "Faith" (George Michael song), 1987
 "Faith" (Ghost song), 2018
 "Faith" (Lords of the Underground song), 1995
 "Faith" (Rina Aiuchi song), 2001
 "Faith" (Stevie Wonder song), 2016
 "Faith" (The Weeknd song), 2020
 "Faith", a song by Jordin Sparks from Battlefield
 "Faith", a song by Luscious Jackson from Fever In Fever Out
 "Faith", a song by Calvin Harris from Motion
 "Faith", a song by Nana Mizuki from Hybrid Universe
 "Faith (In the Power of Love)" by Rozalla, 1991

Name

Given name
 Faith (name), an English feminine given name
 Faith Bandler (1918–2015), Australian civil rights activist of South Sea islander heritage
 Faith Brown (born 1944), British actress and impressionist 
 Faith Dane (born 1923), American entertainer
 Faith Esham (born 1948), American operatic soprano
 Faith Evans (born 1973), American R&B singer
 Faith Ford (born 1964), American actress
 Faith Goldy (born 1989), Canadian political commentator and reporter
 Faith Hedgepeth (1992–2012), American murder victim
 Faithe Herman, American actress
 Faith Hill (born 1967), American country and pop singer
 Lady Mary Faith Montagu (1911–1983), British aristocrat
 Faith Popcorn (born 1947), American futurist
 Faith Whittlesey (1939–2018), American politician, diplomat, lawyer, and writer
 Faith Yang (born 1974), Taiwanese singer and model

Surname
 Adam Faith (1940–2003), English pop singer
 Bob Faith (born 1963/1964), American businessman, founder, chairman and CEO of Greystar Real Estate Partners
 Horace Faith (?–2015), Jamaican reggae singer
 Paloma Faith (born 1981), English singer and actress
 Percy Faith (1908–1976), Canadian bandleader and composer
 Saint Faith, or Saint Foi, a third-century AD French saint

Middle name
 Cora Faith Walker, American lawyer and politician

Nickname
 Corey Taylor (born 1973), American musician nicknamed "Faith"

Characters
 Faith Connors, the protagonist in the action-adventure video game Mirror's Edge
 Faith Herbert, a superhero in the Valiant comics universe
 Faith Lehane, a fictional character for the television series Buffy the Vampire Slayer and Angel, portrayed by Eliza Dushku
 Faith Newman, a character from the American soap opera The Young and the Restless
 Faith Seed, a character in the video game Far Cry 5

Film and television
 Faith (1916 film) or The Virtuous Outcast, a 1916 American silent film
 Faith (1919 film), a 1919 American film directed by Charles Swickard and Rex Wilson
 Faith (1920 film), an American silent romantic drama film
 Faith (British TV series), a 1994 two part TV miniseries
 "Faith" (Law & Order: Criminal Intent), a 2002 episode of Law & Order: Criminal Intent
 "Faith" (Supernatural), a 2006 episode of Supernatural
 "Faith" (Battlestar Galactica), a 2008 episode of Battlestar Galactica
 Faith (Stargate Universe), a 2010 episode of Stargate Universe
 Faith (South Korean TV series), a 2012 South Korean fusion fantasy-historical-medical television series

Ships
 SS Faith, the first concrete ship built in the United States
 MV Empire Faith, a British CAM (catapult aircraft merchant) ship, converted to cargo ship in 1943

Other
 Faith (dog) (2002-2014), bipedal dog, born with only three legs
 Faith (shoe retailer), British shoe company
 Faith 7, name given to the space capsule, by its pilot, in the 1963 US space mission Mercury-Atlas 9
 Faith (novel), first in the Faith, Hope, Charity espionage trilogy of novels by Len Deighton
 Hurricane Faith, a tropical cyclone which reached the Faeroe Islands, part of the 1966 Atlantic hurricane season
 Faith, a magazine published by the Roman Catholic Diocese of Lansing
 Faith (meteorite), a chondrite meteorite
 Faith: The Unholy Trinity, a trilogy of retro style horror video games

See also
 Faith-based schools
 Faith healing
 Faithfulness
 Leap of faith (disambiguation)
 The Faith (disambiguation)
 Faithful (disambiguation)
 Faithless (disambiguation)
 Unfaithful (disambiguation)